The Crown Liquor Saloon, also known as the Crown Bar, is a pub in Great Victoria Street in Belfast, Northern Ireland. Refurbished in 1885, and at least twice since, it is an outstanding example of a Victorian gin palace, and one of Northern Ireland's best-known pubs. It is owned by the National Trust and is leased to Mitchells & Butlers who run it as a Nicholson's pub.

History 

Opened by Felix O'Hanlon as The Railway Tavern, the pub was then bought by Michael Flanagan. Flanagan's son Patrick renamed and renovated it in 1885.

The Crown owes its elaborate tiling, stained glass and woodwork to the Italian craftsmen whom Flanagan persuaded to work on the pub after hours. These craftsmen were brought to Ireland to work on the many new churches being built in Belfast at the time. It was this high standard of work that gave the Crown the reputation of being one of the finest Victorian gin palaces of its time.

In 1978, the National Trust, following persuasion by people including Sir John Betjeman, purchased the property and three years later completed a £400,000 renovation to restore the bar to its original Victorian state. Further restoration by the National Trust was done in 2007 at a cost of £500,000. This work is the subject of a BBC Northern Ireland documentary, The Crown Jewel, screened in 2008.

A recognisable landmark of Belfast, The Crown has featured as a location in numerous film and television productions, such as David Caffrey's Divorcing Jack (1998) and Carol Reed's classic 1947 film Odd Man Out.

The Crown has been given a Grade A Listed Building status by the Environment and Heritage Service.

Features 

The exterior is decorated in polychromatic tiles. This includes a mosaic of a Crown on the floor of the entrance. The interior is also decorated with complex mosaics of tiles. The red granite topped bar is of an altar style, with a heated footrest underneath and is lit by gas lamps on the highly decorative carved ceilings.

The Crown has ten booths, or snugs. Built to accommodate the pub's more reserved customers during the austere Victorian period, the snugs feature the original gun metal plates for striking matches and an antique bell system for alerting staff. Extra privacy was then afforded by the pub's etched and stained glass windows which feature painted shells, fairies, pineapples, fleurs-de-lis and clowns.

References

External links 
 Official website
 Crown Liquor Saloon information at the National Trust
 

National Trust properties in Northern Ireland
Pubs in Belfast
Grade A listed buildings
Art Nouveau architecture in Northern Ireland
Art Nouveau hotels